John Murdoch MacLeod (born 23 November 1938) is a Scottish former footballer who played as a winger.

Career
Born in Edinburgh, MacLeod started his career at his local club, Hibernian, and played 85 times for the Edinburgh side between 1957 and 1961, where he made a name for himself as a talented right winger. He also earned four caps for Scotland, all in 1961. His debut was in an infamous 9–3 defeat at the hands of England and the last appearance was in a 4–0 defeat by Czechoslovakia in a 1962 FIFA World Cup qualification tie.

In July 1961 MacLeod was signed by Arsenal for £40,000 (then a record fee for a winger) and made his debut against Burnley on 19 August 1961. He became a regular for the next three seasons, playing over thirty games in each. In total, he made 112 appearances for Arsenal, scoring 27 goals, despite manager Billy Wright's policy of usually employing only one winger on the pitch. Arsenal were not particularly successful at this time, usually finishing around mid-table, although they did make their European debut, in the Inter-Cities Fairs Cup, in 1963–64. MacLeod scored the opening goal in Arsenal's very first European match, a 7–1 thrashing of Stævnet on 25 September 1963.

In September 1964, with the young George Armstrong pushing for a place in the side, Arsenal found MacLeod surplus to requirements and sold him to Aston Villa for £35,000. He spent four seasons at Villa Park making 123 league appearances, before moving to Belgium to play for KV Mechelen in 1968. In 1971, he returned to his native Scotland to see out his career at Raith Rovers. He retired from playing in 1972.

References

External links 

1938 births
Armadale Thistle F.C. players
Arsenal F.C. players
Association football wingers
Aston Villa F.C. players
Belgian Pro League players
Expatriate footballers in Belgium
Hibernian F.C. players
K.V. Mechelen players
Living people
Footballers from Edinburgh
Raith Rovers F.C. players
Scotland international footballers
Scottish expatriate footballers
Scottish footballers
Scottish Football League players
English Football League players
Scottish Football League representative players
Scotland under-23 international footballers
Newtongrange Star F.C. players
Scottish Junior Football Association players